The Japan Turf Cup Stakes is an American Thoroughbred horse race run, held annually at Maryland's Laurel Park Racecourse. Open to horses age three and older, it is currently run on grass at a distance of one and one-half miles.

Previously run as the Laurel Turf Cup Stakes, it was renamed the Japan Turf Cup Stakes in 2019.

The race was a grade three race from 1985 through 2000. The Turf Cup was taken off the grass and run on the dirt of the main track on the following years; 1971, 72, 75, 76, 85, 86, 90, 96 and 1997. The race was not run between 2007-2010. It was announced by Laurel Park that the famed race would be restored in 2012 and run on October 27 at 12 furlongs and named the Laurel Turf Cup Stakes. In 2014 the race was cut back to 6 furlongs and renamed the Laurel Dash Stakes.

Records 

Speed record: 
  miles - 1:40.40 - Dreadnaught    (2005)  
  miles - 2:25.00 - Native Courier   (1978)
  miles - 1:59.20 - Storm on the Loose   (1986)

Most wins by a trainer:
 3 - King T. Leatherbury (1991, 2011 & 2011)

Most wins by a jockey:
 3 - Edgar Prado  (1993, 1997 & 1998)

Winners of the Laurel Turf Cup Stakes

See also 

 Laurel Turf Cup Stakes top three finishers
 Laurel Park Racecourse

References
 New York Times - October 30, 1955 article on Aeschylus winning the Turf Cup Stakes in course record time

Horse races in Maryland
Turf races in the United States
Open middle distance horse races
Laurel Park Racecourse
Recurring sporting events established in 1952